The events of 1993 in anime.

Accolades  
At the Mainichi Film Awards, Patlabor 2: The Movie won the Animation Film Award. Internationally, Porco Rosso won the award for best feature film at the Annecy International Animated Film Festival.

Releases

TV series 
A list of anime television series that debuted between January 1 and December 31, 1993.

Movies

OVA releases 
A list of original video animations that debuted between January 1 and December 31, 1993.

See also
1993 in animation

External links 
Japanese animated works of the year, listed in the IMDb

Anime
Anime
Years in anime